In elementary algebra, the quadratic formula is a formula that provides the solution(s) to a quadratic equation. There are other ways of solving a quadratic equation instead of using the quadratic formula, such as factoring (direct factoring, grouping, AC method), completing the square, graphing and others.

Given a general quadratic equation of the form

where the plus–minus symbol "±" indicates that the quadratic equation has two solutions. Written separately, they become:

Each of these two solutions is also called a root (or zero) of the quadratic equation.

As well as being a formula that yields the zeros of any parabola, the quadratic formula can also be used to identify the axis of symmetry of the parabola, and the number of real zeros the quadratic equation contains.

The expression b2 − 4ac is known as discriminant. If the discriminant is positive then it has two real square roots; otherwise, it has two complex roots. If a, b, and c are real numbers and  then
 If b2 − 4ac > 0 then there are two distinct real roots or solutions to the equation .
 If b2 − 4ac = 0 then there is one repeated real solution.
 If b2 − 4ac < 0 then there are two distinct complex solutions, which are complex conjugates of each other.

Equivalent formulations
The quadratic formula, in the case when the discriminant  is positive, may also be written as

which may be simplified to

This version of the formula makes it easy to find the roots when using a calculator.

When b is an even integer, it is usually easier to use the reduced formula

In the case when the discriminant  is negative, complex roots are involved. The quadratic formula can be written as:

Muller's method
A lesser known quadratic formula, which is used in Muller's method and which can be found from Vieta's formulas, provides (assuming ) the same roots via the equation:

Formulations based on alternative parametrizations
The standard parametrization of the quadratic equation is

Some sources, particularly older ones, use alternative parameterizations of the quadratic equation such as
 where ,

or
 where .

These alternative parametrizations result in slightly different forms for the solution, but which are otherwise equivalent to the standard parametrization.

Derivations of the formula
Many different methods to derive the quadratic formula are available in the literature. The standard one is a simple application of the completing the square technique. Alternative methods are sometimes simpler than completing the square, and may offer interesting insight into other areas of mathematics.

By completing the square

Subtract  from both sides of the equation, yielding:

The quadratic equation is now in a form to which the method of completing the square is applicable. In fact, by adding a constant to both sides of the equation such that the left hand side becomes a complete square, the quadratic equation becomes:

which produces:

Accordingly, after rearranging the terms on the right hand side to have a common denominator, we obtain:

The square has thus been completed. If the discriminant  is positive, we can take the square root of both sides, yielding the following equation:

(In fact, this equation remains true even if the discriminant is not positive, by interpreting the root of the discriminant as any of its two opposite complex roots.)

In which case, isolating the  would give the quadratic formula:

Shorter method
Completing the square can also be accomplished by a sometimes shorter and simpler sequence:

 Rearrange.
 Add  to both sides to complete the square.
 The left side is the outcome of the polynomial .
 Take the square root of both sides.
 Isolate .

In which case, the quadratic formula can also be derived as follows:

This derivation of the quadratic formula is ancient and was known in India at least as far back as 1025. Compared with the derivation in standard usage, this alternate derivation avoids fractions and squared fractions until the last step and hence does not require a rearrangement after step 3 to obtain a common denominator in the right side.

By substitution
Another technique is solution by substitution. In this technique, we substitute  into the quadratic to get:

Expanding the result and then collecting the powers of  produces:

Subtracting the constant term from both sides of the equation (to move it to the right hand side) and then dividing by  gives:

Substituting for  gives:

Therefore,

By re-expressing  in terms of  using the formula  , the usual quadratic formula can then be obtained:

By using algebraic identities
The following method was used by many historical mathematicians:

The derivation starts by recalling the identity:

Taking the square root on both sides, we get:

Namely,

Hence the identity can be rewritten as:

Now,

Since , if we take

then we obtain

and if we instead take

then we calculate that

Combining these results by using the standard shorthand ±, we have that the solutions of the quadratic equation are given by:

By Lagrange resolvents

An alternative way of deriving the quadratic formula is via the method of Lagrange resolvents, which is an early part of Galois theory.
This method can be generalized to give the roots of cubic polynomials and quartic polynomials, and leads to Galois theory, which allows one to understand the solution of algebraic equations of any degree in terms of the symmetry group of their roots, the Galois group.

This approach focuses on the roots more than on rearranging the original equation. Given a monic quadratic polynomial

assume that it factors as

Expanding yields

The Galois theory approach to analyzing and solving polynomials is: given the coefficients of a polynomial, which are symmetric functions in the roots, can one "break the symmetry" and recover the roots? Thus solving a polynomial of degree  is related to the ways of rearranging ("permuting")  terms, which is called the symmetric group on  letters, and denoted . For the quadratic polynomial, the only ways to rearrange two terms is to leave them be or to swap them ("transpose" them), and thus solving a quadratic polynomial is simple.

These are called the Lagrange resolvents of the polynomial; notice that one of these depends on the order of the roots, which is the key point. One can recover the roots from the resolvents by inverting the above equations:

Thus, solving for the resolvents gives the original roots.

But  is not symmetric, since switching  and  yields  (formally, this is termed a group action of the symmetric group of the roots). Using the equation

yields

and thus

If one takes the positive root, breaking symmetry, one obtains:

and thus

Thus the roots are

which is the quadratic formula. Substituting  yields the usual form for when a quadratic is not monic.

The same method for a quintic equation yields a polynomial of degree 24, which does not simplify the problem, and, in fact, solutions to quintic equations in general cannot be expressed using only roots.

Historical development
The earliest methods for solving quadratic equations were geometric. Babylonian cuneiform tablets contain problems reducible to solving quadratic equations. The Egyptian Berlin Papyrus, dating back to the Middle Kingdom (2050 BC to 1650 BC), contains the solution to a two-term quadratic equation.

The Greek mathematician Euclid (circa 300 BC) used geometric methods to solve quadratic equations in Book 2 of his Elements, an influential mathematical treatise. Rules for quadratic equations appear in the Chinese The Nine Chapters on the Mathematical Art circa 200 BC. In his work Arithmetica, the Greek mathematician Diophantus (circa 250 AD) solved quadratic equations with a method more recognizably algebraic than the geometric algebra of Euclid. His solution gives only one root, even when both roots are positive.

The Indian mathematician Brahmagupta (597–668 AD) explicitly described the quadratic formula in his treatise Brāhmasphuṭasiddhānta published in 628 AD, but written in words instead of symbols. His solution of the quadratic equation  was as follows: "To the absolute number multiplied by four times the [coefficient of the] square, add the square of the [coefficient of the] middle term; the square root of the same, less the [coefficient of the] middle term, being divided by twice the [coefficient of the] square is the value."
This is equivalent to:

Śrīdharācāryya (870–930 AD), an Indian mathematician also came up with a similar algorithm for solving quadratic equations, though there is no indication that he considered both the roots.
The 9th-century Persian mathematician Muḥammad ibn Mūsā al-Khwārizmī solved quadratic equations algebraically. The quadratic formula covering all cases was first obtained by Simon Stevin in 1594. In 1637 René Descartes published La Géométrie containing special cases of the quadratic formula in the form we know today.

Significant uses

Geometric significance

In terms of coordinate geometry, a parabola is a curve whose -coordinates are described by a second-degree polynomial, i.e. any equation of the form:

The geometrical interpretation of the quadratic formula is that it defines the points on the -axis where the parabola will cross the axis. Additionally, if the quadratic formula was looked at as two terms,

the axis of symmetry appears as the line . The other term, gives the distance the zeros are away from the axis of symmetry, where the plus sign represents the distance to the right, and the minus sign represents the distance to the left.

If this distance term were to decrease to zero, the value of the axis of symmetry would be the  value of the only zero, that is, there is only one possible solution to the quadratic equation. Algebraically, this means that , or simply  (where the left-hand side is referred to as the discriminant). This is one of three cases, where the discriminant indicates how many zeros the parabola will have. If the discriminant is positive, the distance would be non-zero, and there will be two solutions. However, there is also the case where the discriminant is less than zero, and this indicates the distance will be imaginary or some multiple of the complex unit , where  and the parabola's zeros will be complex numbers. The complex roots will be complex conjugates, where the real part of the complex roots will be the value of the axis of symmetry. There will be no real values of  where the parabola crosses the -axis.

Dimensional analysis
This can be a powerful tool for verifying that a quadratic expression of physical quantities has been set up correctly, prior to solving this.

See also
 Fundamental theorem of algebra
 Vieta's formulas

References

Elementary algebra
Equations